An advertising board, or A-board, is usually a term reserved for the advertising hoardings seen at association football matches, although there are other more general forms such as billboards and posters.

Advertising boards first appeared around football stadiums in the 1970s, and are now commonplace in professional football grounds.

Advertising techniques
Advertising tools
Promotion and marketing communications
Terminology used in multiple sports
Association football terminology
Rugby league terminology
Rugby union terminology

tr:Reklam panosu